Wretched and Divine: The Story of the Wild Ones is the third studio album by American rock band Black Veil Brides. It is a rock opera concept album that was released through Lava Records/Universal Republic Records on January 8, 2013. Pre-orders for the album became available to download from iTunes on Halloween, October 31. The track "In the End" is the album's lead single, and was offered as an instant download to everyone who pre-ordered the album from iTunes after October 31. "In the End" was featured as one of the theme songs for WWE's Hell in a Cell and was also featured as a song on the soundtrack for EA Sports' NHL 14 video game.

Black Veil Brides embarked on a North American tour, titled "The Church of the Wild Ones Tour" in support of the album, lasting from January–March, 2013. In February, they took a small break from the tour to headline the Kerrang! Tour in the UK, with supporting acts Chiodos, Tonight Alive, and Fearless Vampire Killers. They returned to North America to finish off the last leg of "The Church of the Wild Ones Tour".

Music
Described as hard rock heavy metal, and glam metal, the album features elements of gothic rock, spoken word, punk rock and symphonic music. The album also is noted for featuring orchestration.

Release and promotion 
Black Veil Brides began releasing details and teasers for Wretched and Divine: The Story of the Wild Ones almost a year before the album's release date:

Guitarists Jinxx and Jake told Chris Droney in an interview for Glasswerk National that the band are constantly writing new music, and were planning on recording their next major LP in April 2012. On February 18, Jake tweeted, "Amazing stuff. This next record is going to kick your asses." In a February 2012 interview, Ashley Purdy announced that the band's third studio album was scheduled to be released towards the end of 2012.

On May 2, Black Veil Brides had this to announce: "As of today, we have officially began recording our new album which will be released on October 30th!"

Andy said in an interview at Download Festival that "We've got three songs tracked. We've set ourselves a deadline of the end of August to finish it. We've got 20 to 25 songs written and we're narrowing it down now. John Feldmann is producing it. It's going to be more of a punk rock record than anything we've done before. It's Social Distortion meets Metallica." Based on this statement, many people were led to believe that the record would literally be a punk rock album, but Biersack clarified his statement in an interview with Artisan News, stating "The intention was never to make a punk rock record. I think that... maybe I should have chosen my words better when I said that. The intention was to play on our influences a lot more and really go back to basics with how we wrote songs and focusing [sic] on the more punk rock ethic and the things that we felt early on when we were making our own merchandise; touring in a car with, you know, all of us sitting on top of each other in a U-Haul trailer; and, you know, playing in clubs on soap, like, [sic] little soapboxes and stuff... I didn't wanna make a Stiff Little Fingers record."

September 4, Biersack announced via Twitter that they had finished recording of the new album: "Well tracking has officially wrapped for the new record! Still some stuff to finish up but I'm so happy, excited & proud of this album!!"

The Wretched and Divine: The Story of the Wild Ones – Ultimate Edition CD/DVD was released on June 11, 2013.

Release delay 
It was announced that the release of the album would be pushed back from October 30, 2012 to sometime in January 2013. On October 8, the album cover and album name were released, along with the announcement that pre-orders would be launched from iTunes on Halloween, October 31. The song "In the End" became available for purchase on the same date of the pre-order. On December 12, the music video for "In the End" was released on YouTube and has been viewed over 134 million times. On October 29, the band announced the official track list and release date for the album: Wretched and Divine: The Story of the Wild Ones was eventually released on January 8, 2013.

Commercial performance 
The album went on to sell 42,000 units in its first week, opening at number 7 in the Billboard 200, making this album the band's first top ten entry on the chart. "In the End" reached number 3 on the Billboard Rock Charts. The album reached number 1 on the iTunes Top Albums charts and the lead single, "In the End", reached number 6 on the iTunes Top Rock Songs charts.

Since its release, the album has sold in the United States over 200,000 copies as of October 8, 2014.

Critical reception 

Wretched and Divine received mixed to positive reviews. It currently holds a 64/100 rating on Metacritc, a site which averages professional review scores. The album received a rating of KKKK, or excellent, from Kerrang! Magazine as well as a 5 star review of Artistdirect and a 3.5/5 review from both Loudwire and Alternative Press.

Other reviewers weren't as positive with the album, with Dom Lawson of The Guardian voicing his personal distaste of the album, although saying that existing fans will be satisfied. Some negative press was leveled at the F.E.A.R. Transmissions as well as the album's concept overall.

Track listing

Charts

Album artwork 

The cover art for Wretched and Divine: The Story of the Wild Ones was painted by Richard Villa—long-time Black Veil Brides cover artist—who also painted the cover art for We Stitch These Wounds, "Perfect Weapon," Set the World on Fire, "Fallen Angels," and Rebels.

The cover artwork depicts a lone child—holding the Black Veil Brides pentacharm—standing up against the army of F.E.A.R., representative of a David and Goliath-style standoff. On the Ultimate Edition cover, the sky is dark and cloudy, giving more dramatic lighting.

Film adaptation: Legion of the Black 

Along with the release of the album's pre-order information, a teaser for a full-length film was posted to the band's YouTube, as well as shared through their Facebook page. The film, titled Legion of the Black, "follows a group of rebels known as "The Wild Ones" as they defend their hearts, minds and bodies against F.E.A.R.". It was screened at the Silent Movie Theater in Los Angeles, California, on December 21, December 22 and December 23, 2012 and released on DVD.  At the end, the voice of F.E.A.R., played by William Control, rises up and makes new soldiers, hinting at a sequel.

The Special Edition and Ultimate Edition of Wretched and Divine both include a DVD titled "BVB in the Studio: The Making of Wretched and Divine," which depicts behind-the-scenes footage of Black Veil Brides' making of the album, and in the film, Biersack tells that F.E.A.R. is an acronym which stands for "For Every and All Religion."

Personnel 
Credits adapted from booklet.

(DVD comes with Ultimate Edition of Wretched and Divine: The Story of the Wild Ones)

Black Veil Brides
 Andy Biersack – lead vocals
 Jake Pitts – lead guitar
 Jinxx – rhythm guitar, strings
 Ashley Purdy – bass, backing vocals
 Christian Coma – drums

Performance credits
 Brandon Hall Paddock – backing vocals, additional backing vocals, arrangements
 Tommy English – backing vocals, instrumentation, additional backing vocals
 Josh Sarles – backing vocals, instrumentation, additional backing vocals
 Aaron Edwards – additional programming for Merchants of Venice Entertainment (M.O.V.E.) (track 6)
 John Feldmann – additional orchestration, programming, instrumentation, additional backing vocals
 Roberta Freeman – additional vocals  (track 16)
 Juliet Simms – additional vocals (track 16)
 Bert McCracken – additional vocals (track 13)
 Caitlin Higgins – additional backing vocals
 Mike Hart – additional backing vocals
 Jessica Manis – additional backing vocals
 Pete Beukelman – additional backing vocals
 Hannah Peskin – children's choir
 Ariana Warren – children's choir
 Martina Hemstreet – children's choir
 Ellie Posen – children's choir
 William Control – the voice of F.E.A.R.

Visuals and imagery
 Richard Villa III – illustration, design
 Glen LaFerman – photography

Technical and production
 John Feldmann – production, recording, mixing
 Brandon Hall Paddock – engineering, additional production
 Tommy English – engineering assistant, additional engineering
 Josh Sarles – engineering assistant, additional engineering
 Joe Gastwirt – mastering

Managerial
 Jason Flom – A&R
 Blasko – management for Mercenary Management, Inc.
 Dan Tsurif – management
 Nicole Schrad – management assistant
 Dina LaPolt – legal for LaPolt Law, P.C.
 Tom Reed – business management for the Affiliated Group
 Jodi Williams – business management for the Affiliated Group
 Ash Avildsen – U.S. booking for The Pantheon Group
 Jim Morewood – European booking for E.G.O.

Guest appearances 
Black Veil Brides revealed through social media that several guests artists were to appear on album:

On August 27, they tweeted that William Control (Aiden) had joined them in the studio to contribute to the album: "@williamcontrol joined us #inthestudio today!" William also appeared on the set of Black Veil Brides' upcoming music video, playing as the voice of F.E.A.R. (it is to be assumed that the reason he appeared in the studio on August 27, is that he is also the voice of F.E.A.R. on the album).

On Friday, August 31, they posted a picture to their Facebook page with the caption "It's a good Friday in the studio! Our good pal Bert McCracken from The Used is throwing down some awesomeness on our album!!!" Andy also tweeted about Bert's studio visit, saying "Stoked to have @bro_mccracken in the studio today doing some vox #BVB2013".

WWE used "In the End" as one of the official theme songs for the 2012 Hell in a Cell event.

References 

2013 albums
Black Veil Brides albums
Albums produced by John Feldmann
Rock operas
Universal Republic Records albums
Lava Records albums